Daniel Cross may refer to:

Daniel Cross (filmmaker), Canadian documentary filmmaker and producer
Daniel Cross (footballer) (born 1983), Australian rules footballer
Daniel Cross (Assassin's Creed), a fictional character from Assassin's Creed
Daniel Cross (Coronation Street), a fictional character from Coronation Street

See also
Cross (surname)